Francis ("Frank") R. Kowsky (born 1943) is a notable architectural historian and State University of New York (SUNY) Distinguished Professor of Fine Arts at Buffalo State College, SUNY, Buffalo, New York.  He has published on nineteenth-century American architects and architecture including Frederick Withers, Calvert Vaux, and H. H. Richardson, as well as the architecture and landscape of Buffalo and northwestern New York State.  He is also active in historic preservation and has served on the New York State Board for Historic Preservation, the Board of Directors of the Preservation Coalition of Erie County, New York, and is currently a trustee of the National Association for Olmsted Parks.

Writings

 Kowsky, Francis R., The Architecture of Frederick Clarke Withers and the Progress of the Gothic Revival in America after 1850, Wesleyan University Press, Middletown CT 1980;  
 Kowsky, Francis R., Buffalo Architecture: A Guide, MIT Press, Cambridge MA and London 1981;  
 Kowsky, Francis R., Country, Park & City: The Architecture and Life of Calvert Vaux, Oxford University Press, New York 1998;  
 Kowsky, Francis R., "H.H. Richardson's Project for the Young Men's Association Library in Buffalo," Niagara Frontier 25/2 (1978), pp. 29–35
 Kowsky, Francis R., "The William Dorsheimer House: A Reflection of French Suburban Architecture in the Early Work of H. H. Richardson," Art Bulletin, 62 (March 1980), pp. 321–147
 Kowsky,  Francis R., "H. H. Richardson's Ames Gate Lodge and the Romantic Landscape Tradition", in Journal of the Society of Architectural Historians, 50/2 (June 1991), pp. 181–188.

References

External links
 Buffalo State College

1943 births
Living people
American architectural historians
American architecture writers
American male non-fiction writers
American biographers
Writers from Buffalo, New York
Buffalo State College faculty
Historians from New York (state)